The 1983 Gilbey's Gin Gimlets season was the 5th season of the franchise in the Philippine Basketball Association (PBA). Known as Gilbey's Gin Tonics in the Open Conference.

Transactions

Summary
Gilbey's Gin landed in the finals of the revived All-Filipino Conference, after a two-year absence of the league's most prestigious tournament, the Gins lost to powerhouse Crispa Redmanizers via three-game sweep in the best-of-five title series. 

The high-scoring Lew Massey return as their import with Gilbey's now sported a new monicker "Gimlets" in the Reinforced Filipino Conference. Gilbey's split their 14 games in the eliminations with seven wins and seven loss each and won all three of their quarterfinal matches.  In the semifinal round, the Gimlets create a triple tie with Crispa and Great Taste for the two finals berth. The Redmanizers enters the finals first with a higher quotient while Gilbey's lost to Great Taste in a playoff match.

Gilbey's will have another monicker as the Gin Tonics in the Open Conference and two new imports suited up, Anthony Roberts, a first round draft pick by Denver who played the entire 82-game schedule of the NBA as a rookie in the 1977–1978 season, and Jack Dorsey, a second round pick by New Orleans Jazz in the 1976 NBA draft and who had brief stints with three NBA teams. Three games into the Open Conference, "Sweet Lew" Massey was reinstated to replaced Anthony Roberts after Gilbey's dropped their first two outings. Massey teamed up with Jacky Dorsey as Gilbey's again figured in a finals playoff berth with all four semifinalist tied with three wins and three losses.  The Gin Tonics fell short of advancing in the championship round and were denied by Great Taste Coffee Makers for the second time in the season.

Won-loss records vs Opponents

Roster

 Team Manager: Adolf Ferrer

References

Barangay Ginebra San Miguel seasons
Gilbey's Gin